is a railway station on the Okinawa Urban Monorail (Yui Rail) located in Naha, Okinawa Prefecture, Japan. In the original plans, this station was to be called Makabi Station, after the neighboring district, but opened as Omoromachi Station on August 10, 2003.

The station serves the Omoromachi Shintoshin (New City Heart/Center) area, which includes a major shopping complex accessed by an elevated pedestrian deck connected directly to the station, Shintoshin Park, and the Okinawa Prefectural Museum.

From just before Asato Station, through Omoromachi Station, to shortly after Furujima Station, the monorail tracks run directly above, and following, Japan National Route 330 (Asato Bypass).

The station has two facing platforms with one track each. Platform 1 serves Shuri-bound trains and Platform 2 serves trains bound for Naha Airport.

The chime played to announce train arrivals and departures is the traditional Okinawan folk song Danjukariyushi.

Lines 
Okinawa Urban Monorail

Adjacent stations

External links

Railway stations in Japan opened in 2003
Railway stations in Okinawa Prefecture
Naha